Sükhbaatar is one of nine Düüregs (districts) of the Mongolian capital Ulaanbaatar. It is subdivided into 18 Khoroos (subdistricts). The district was established in 1965 and named after Damdin Sükhbaatar, a Mongolian military leader and revolutionary hero. As of 2004, it had an approximate population of 112,533 in 24,568 households.

This district marks the center of the city. Most government, educational and cultural organizations are located here: The Mongolian Government house, The Parliament house, 13 Embassies, Government Ministries, the World Bank, the United Nations Development Programme (UNDP), the National University of Mongolia, and the University of Science and Technology.

The head office of the airline Hunnu Air (formerly Mongolian Airlines) is in the district.

Education

School No.1 of Ulaanbaatar

References

Districts of Ulaanbaatar